This is a list of radio stations in West Coast in New Zealand.

References

West Coast
West Coast, New Zealand